Mattias Schnorf (born April 21, 1984 in Uetikon am See) is a Swiss footballer currently playing for FC Schaffhausen in the third division Swiss 1. Liga.

Career
Schnorf began his career with the lauded Grasshopper Club Zürich, for whom he signed aged 17, and he spent two seasons with the team, but never made a first team appearance and moving to FC Winterthur in the Swiss Challenge League in 2003. He went on to play in 127 games as a central defender for Winterthur, scoring one goal in a 1–1 tie with FC Chiasso in 2010.

Schnorf crossed the Atlantic to the United States when he signed with Atlanta Silverbacks of the North American Soccer League. He made his debut on for his new club on May 14, 2011 in a game against the NSC Minnesota Stars.

At the conclusion of the 2011 season, Schnorf was loaned to SC Young Fellows Juventus of the Swiss 1. Liga on September 26, 2011. The Swiss club purchased him outright on October 12, 2011.

International
Schnorf is a Swiss youth international, having earned six caps for the Switzerland U-21 team.

References

External links
Atlanta Silverbacks bio

1984 births
Living people
Swiss men's footballers
Atlanta Silverbacks players
FC Winterthur players
North American Soccer League players
Expatriate soccer players in the United States
SC Young Fellows Juventus players
FC Schaffhausen players
Swiss Challenge League players
Switzerland under-21 international footballers
Association football defenders